Small Is Profitable: The Hidden Economic Benefits of Making Electrical Resources the Right Size is a 2002 book by energy analyst Amory Lovins and others.  The book describes 207 ways in which the size of "electrical resources"—devices that make, save, or store electricity—affects their economic value. It finds that properly accounting for the economic benefits of "distributed" (decentralized) electrical resources typically raises their value by a large factor, perhaps tenfold, through improved system planning, utility construction and operation (especially off the grid), and service quality, and by avoiding social costs.  This should change how distributed resources are marketed and used, and make policy and business opportunities explicit.

Small Is Profitable was named 'Book of the Year' by The Economist magazine.

See also
Brittle Power
Soft energy technology
List of books by Amory Lovins
Small business
V2G

References

Environmental non-fiction books
2002 non-fiction books
2002 in the environment
Books by Amory Lovins
Books about energy issues